The Manhattan Jazz Quintet is a jazz ensemble consisting of David Matthews on piano, Lew Soloff on trumpet, Victor Lewis on drums, Andy Snitzer on saxophone, and Charnett Moffett on bass. Previously, the band featured George Young on tenor sax, Eddie Gómez on bass, and Steve Gadd on drums.

The group was formed in 1983 at the suggestion of Japanese jazz magazine Swing Journal and the King record label and won the Gold Disk Award of Swing in 1984.

Gadd left in 1987, with Dave Weckl serving as a replacement in 1988 and 1989, but came back for a reunion in 1990, with John Scofield as guest artist on a number of selections. These later recordings were recorded for the Sweet Basil label.

Gomez left the band after the recording of Manteca in 1992 and was replaced by Charnett Moffett. Gadd left the band, with Victor Lewis becoming his permanent replacement in 1993; Young left in 2000 and was replaced by Andy Snitzer.

Due to the group's albums limited distribution in other countries (albums are only available as imports from Japan), it is not well known outside Japan.

Discography

Mahattan Jazz Quintet also recorded Good King Wenceslas for the compilation CD Chiaroscuro Christmas.

Filmography

References

External links
  MJQ artist page at Video Arts Music

American jazz ensembles